Han Guangsheng (韩广生; born 1952), emerged as a Chinese defector in Canada during July, 2005 to support a number of allegations made by Chen Yonglin.  Han claims to have been in charge of Shenyang's public security and labor camps prior to his defection.

References

Chinese defectors
1952 births
Living people
Date of birth missing (living people)
Place of birth missing (living people)